Robert Alexander Pinn (March 1, 1843 – January 5, 1911) was an African American Union Army soldier during the American Civil War and a recipient of America's highest military decoration—the Medal of Honor—for his actions at the Battle of Chaffin's Farm.

Biography
Robert A. Pinn was one of only four Black Americans from Ohio to receive the Medal of Honor during the American Civil War. Pinn was born on a Perry Township farm and was the sixth of 10 children born to William and Zilphia Penn. He attended school and worked on the farm until he was 18.

Pinn joined the Army in Massillon, Ohio, and by September 29, 1864, he was serving as a First Sergeant in Company I of the 5th U.S. Colored Infantry Regiment, also known as the 127th Ohio Volunteer Infantry. On that day, his unit participated in the Battle of Chaffin's Farm in Virginia, and it was for his actions during the battle that he was awarded the Medal of Honor six months later, on April 6, 1865.

Pinn returned to Massillion after the war where he worked as a contractor and teamster. In 1874 he entered Oberlin College and after graduation served as principal of Cairo High School and taught school in South Carolina. After teaching, Pinn returned to Massillion and read in the law office of Robert H. Folger. Pinn was admitted to the Ohio bar in 1879.

Pinn was married to Emily J. Manzilla, (deceased 1890) and they had a daughter Gracie R. Pinn (deceased 1938). Pinn died at age 67 and was buried in Massillon City Cemetery, Massillon, Ohio.

In 1973, the Ohio National Guard named its new armory in Stow, Ohio, in his honor.

In 1998, the shooting facility at the University of Akron was renamed the Robert A. Pinn Shooting Range in his honor. The range, used by the university's ROTC component and NCAA rifle team, is one of the premier shooting facilities in the state of Ohio.

Medal of Honor citation

Rank and Organization:
First Sergeant, Company I, 5th U.S. Colored Troops. Place and date: At Chapins Farm, Va., September 29, 1864. Entered service at: Massillon, Ohio. Born: March 1, 1843, Stark County, Ohio. Date of issue: April 6, 1865.

Citation:
Took command of his company after all the officers had been killed or wounded and gallantly led it in battle.

See also

List of Medal of Honor recipients
List of American Civil War Medal of Honor recipients: M–P
List of African American Medal of Honor recipients
Melvin Claxton and Mark Puls, Uncommon valor : a story of race, patriotism, and glory in the final battles of the Civil War, (Wiley, 2006)

References

External links

1843 births
1911 deaths
African Americans in the American Civil War
United States Army Medal of Honor recipients
People from Massillon, Ohio
Union Army soldiers
American Civil War recipients of the Medal of Honor
20th-century African-American people